Dunleer is a town and townland in County Louth, Ireland. Dunleer is situated midway between Dundalk and Drogheda and is located on the junction of the R132, R169 and R170 regional roads that intersect the town.

Dunleer used to be the principal Town Borough in the Barony of Ferrard and has a Charter dating back to 1252.

History

The town has ties to the early sixth century Christian monastery of Lann Léire. The monastery, which was located approximately where today Dunleer's Church of Ireland church is now located, suffered numerous attacks over its history and was finally burned to the ground in 1148. After a period of ruin, the Norman family of De Audley settled the area about thirty years later.

In 1513, John Barnewall was knighted and received large grants of land in the Dunleer area, including the manor of Dunleer. It is possible that it was at this time that the settlement became known as "Dún" Leire. It is hard to determine when it  changed to "Dún" There is a reference to "the ville of Dún Leire" in old records dating from 1227. The town was raised to the status of a Manor at this time. Dunleer was subsequently granted a Market Town Charter in 1252, with the right to hold a Fair and Markets at various times.
 
Dunleer is the principal town in the former Barony of Ferrard and was granted an enhanced Charter by King Charles II in 1671 to hold markets and fairs.
 
This was followed by Royal Charter in 1678 establishing Dunleer as a Municipal Corporation (Town Borough Council). This was to encourage greater settlement. The Corporation had 13 members, and annually elected a mayor, known as "Sovereign" of the Borough. It was the very last Borough to be established in Ireland. 
 
Dunleer at one time also elected two members of parliament to the old Irish House of Commons, which was abolished by the Act of Union in 1801. After the Act of Union between the English and Irish House of Commons, there was very little business for the Corporation to do. It last convened in 1811.

Demographics
Dunleer's population grew from 1,104 to 1,822 inhabitants between the 1991 and 2016 census.

Dunleer's proximity to Drogheda, Ardee, Dundalk, and its location as a crossroads on the main north-south economic corridor of Ireland have made this once rural village officially a town.

Industry

Dunleer has been a centre of industry from the 17th Century.

At one time it had three water powered mills. Rosevale; which was a flax mill (location of today's Glen Dimplex on the Barn Road), Skibbolmore; which was a steel pin manufacturing mill (later converted to flour milling) and in 2021 restored as a house. and Glebe Mill (operating since 1698) which is still producing stone ground flour in small amounts from time to time for the artisan trade.

Dunleer has also been a centre of domestic appliance manufacturing since the late 1930s, and is still a centre of manufacturing, with two factories employing several hundred people. There are also a number of services firms in the area. Dunleer is also home to Suretank, an industrial liquid container technology firm. Glen Dimplex the local company also produces technology to help upgrade homes and businesses.

Dunleer Development Board founded a "New Energy Ambassador" program to help people reduce energy costs and upgrade their homes in 2016 and 2017.

Education
Dunleer is served by several schools, all of which are co-educational facilities.

The town has three mixed gender national (primary) schools: St. Kevins National School, St. Fintan's National School, and St. Brigids National School.

Scoil Ui Mhuiri Post Primary, the only secondary school in the local area, is a mixed post-primary school which is located on Barn Road in Dunleer. The school has seen the construction of a number of extensions over the years, and has 586 pupils enrolled with over 50 staff employed. The school received funding for a multimillion-euro extension but (as of 2018), the work was halted. The work was originally planned to be finished before the end of 2018.

Amenities and community life

Dunleer has a Roman Catholic church (St. Brigid's) and a Church of Ireland Church. There is also a community library which is located in the old Station Master's House on Station Road.

The local Pavilion Centre has an indoor basketball arena and gym facilities. Dunleer also has an outdoor athletics racing track, the home of Dunleer Athletic Club, located on Lann Léire C.P.G. football sports campus. Dunleer A.C. organise the world-famous Ras na hEireann Cross-Country International Athlete Races.

Efforts are underway to establish a Gaelscoil (an Irish language medium primary school) in the area.

The Market House of Dunleer reopened during July 2014. It is the civic centre of Dunleer Village, and is a civic body established by the Dunleer Community Development Board, whom are the trustees of the building. The board formed a Limited Liability Company, known as DCDB Limited to manage the market house as a civic amenity.

Dunleer has a number of community groups, many of which are affiliated to the community umbrella body, the Dunleer Community Development Board. One such community group is the Dunleer Tidy Towns committee. The Tidy Towns committee partners with Dunleer Development Board in funding projects and have succeeded in 2016 and 2017. Part of the strategy for developing the town is expected be the development of a river walk along the White River which runs through Dunleer. Dunleer was a prize winner (2nd place) in the 2017 Pride of Place an All Ireland Competition. And Dunleer also won the Leinster and All Ireland Enterprise town of the year Award 2018 (posted January 2019).

Sport
Dunleer is home to Lannleire GFC, the town's only Gaelic football club. The club grounds are one of the largest in the county, with an athletics club accommodated at the grounds too.

Transport

Dunleer railway station opened on 1 April 1851, closed for goods traffic on 2 December 1974 and finally closed altogether on 26 November 1984. The local community has an ongoing campaign to have the railway station reopened, and there was a public meeting held on 21 February 2008 in which the public gave support to having the existing station reopened.

During September 2009, it became an issue during the formation of the forthcoming Louth County Development Plan, and after much debate and discussion amongst the public and their public representatives, Dunleer's station was granted equal status with Drogheda and Dundalk in being eligible during the lifetime of the plan as a preferable location to have another railway station opened on the Dublin - Belfast rail corridor.

The railway station was refurbished in 2014, but still remains closed to the public.

The town is served by a bus service, which links the town primarily to Drogheda and Dundalk, and some direct services to and from Dublin city daily.

Location 
Located adjacent to the M1 motorway to its west, there is access to and from the M1, as Dunleer is served by three motorway interchanges (M1 Junctions 12, 13 and 14) and is bisected by the main Dublin-Belfast railway line. These linkages played a part in Dunleer changing from a mainly rural town to an expanding commuter town for those working primarily in Dublin, Drogheda and Dundalk.

Annalistic references

 919. Cearnach, son of Flann, Abbot of Lann-Leire, died; of whom was said:
 The torch of the plain (good in battle)/of Bregia the fair and lovely, stout his strength/Brilliance of the sun, the sun upon his cheek. Cearnach of Leire, mournful/the loss of him.

References

External links

Dunleer Online
Dunleer Parish

Towns and villages in County Louth
Townlands of County Louth